The Filmfare Lifetime Achievement Award is given by the Filmfare magazine as part of its annual Filmfare Awards South ceremony.

Recipients

Notes

References

General

Specific

External links
 55th Filmfare Awards South Winners

Lifetime Achievement
Lifetime achievement awards